This article contains lists of geographic bodies by area.

Total

Oceans

Supranational political entities

Sources
CIA World Factbook, 1 August 2003.

See also
List of political and geographic subdivisions by total area
List of countries and outlying territories by total area
Orders of magnitude (area)

Geography-related lists
Lists by area